Etang de la Gruère is a small lake in the Jura range near Saignelégier, Canton of Jura, Switzerland. The lake and the surrounding bog is a nature preserve. The lake was formed in the 17th century, when a dam was built for a mill.

See also
List of mountain lakes of Switzerland

References

External links
Gruère Pond short description

Lakes of the canton of Jura
Lakes of Switzerland